Sir Marmaduke Wyvill, 5th Baronet (c.1666–1722) was an English politician and official.

He was the eldest son of Sir William Wyvill, 4th Baronet and his wife Anne Brookes, and entered Trinity College, Cambridge in 1682, as a fellow commoner. He then under Queen Anne held official positions in the excise and other tax areas.

In 1711 Wyvill became a Fellow of the Royal Society, supported by Owen Brigstocke.

Family
Wyville married Henrietta Maria, daughter of Sir Thomas Yarburgh of Snaith, MP. She had been maid of honour to Catherine of Braganza and Mary of Modena. They had three sons and four daughters. Sir Marmaduke Wyvill, 6th Baronet was their son.

Notes

1660s births
1722 deaths
Alumni of Trinity College, Cambridge
English MPs 1695–1698
Fellows of the Royal Society
Baronets in the Baronetage of England